= Company registration in Ghana =

Business registration program

Ghana has several business registration systems. Company registration is done by the Registrar General's Department, but this duty will be transferred to the new Office of the Registrar of Companies under the terms of the Companies Act, 2018. Both resident Ghanaian companies and branches of foreign companies are required to register and obtain a permit before operating in Ghana. In 2008-2009 procedures were simplified and the target is now to complete registration within one day.
